Lisne may refer to several places in Ukraine:

Chernihiv Oblast
Lisne, Chernihiv Oblast, village in Chernihiv Raion

Crimea
Lisne, Crimea, village in Sudak Municipality

Dnipropetrovsk Oblast
Lisne, Dnipropetrovsk Oblast, village in Synelnykove Raion

Donetsk Oblast
Lisne (urban-type settlement), Donetsk Oblast, urban-type settlement in Makiivka Municipality
Lisne, Mariupol Raion, Donetsk Oblast, rural settlement in Pokrovsk Raion
Lisne, Volnovakha Raion, Donetsk Oblast, rural settlement in Volnovakha

Kharkiv Oblast
Lisne, Bohodukhiv Raion, Kharkiv Oblast, rural settlement in Bohodukhiv Raion
Lisne, Chuhuiv Raion, Kharkiv Oblast, rural settlement in Chuhuiv Raion
Lisne, Kharkiv Raion, Kharkiv Oblast, rural settlement in Kharkiv Raion

Khmelnytskyi Oblast
Lisne, Khmelnytskyi Oblast, rural settlement in Shepetivka Raion

Kirovohrad Oblast
Lisne, Holovanivsk Raion, Kirovohrad Oblast, rural settlement in Holovanivsk Raion
Lisne, Kropyvnytskyi Raion, Kirovohrad Oblast, village in Kropyvnytskyi Raion

Kyiv Oblast
Lisne, Kyiv Oblast, village in Bucha Raion

Luhansk Oblast
Lisne, Antratsyt Municipality, Luhansk Oblast, rural settlement in Antratsyt Municipality
Lisne, Krasnyi Luch Municipality, Luhansk Oblast, village in Krasnyi Luch Municipality
Lisne, Lutuhyne Raion, Luhansk Oblast, rural settlement in Lutuhyne Raion

Odessa Oblast
Lisne, Odessa Oblast, village in Bolhrad Raion

Poltava Oblast
Lisne, Poltava Oblast, village in Poltava Raion

Sumy Oblast
Lisne, Okhtyrka Raion, Sumy Oblast, rural settlement in Okhtyrka Raion
Lisne, Seredyna-Buda urban hromada, Shostka Raion, Sumy Oblast, village in Shostka Raion
Lisne, Shostka urban hromada, Shostka Raion, Sumy Oblast, village in Shostka Raion
Lisne, Yampil settlement hromada, Shostka Raion, Sumy Oblast, village in Shostka Raion
Lisne, Sumy Raion, Sumy Oblast, village in Sumy Raion

Vinnytsia Oblast
Lisne, Vinnytsia Raion, Vinnytsia Oblast, village in Vinnytsia Raion

Zaporizhzhia Oblast
Lisne, Vasylivka Raion, Zaporizhzhia Oblast, village in Vasylivka Raion
Lisne, Zaporizhzhia Raion, Zaporizhzhia Oblast, village in Zaporizhzhia Raion